Enqelab (also spelled Enghelab) means "revolution" in Persian, and may refer to several places in Iran:

 Enghelāb-e Eslāmi Technical College, Tehran
 Enghelab Sport Complex, Tehran
 Enghelab Stadium, Karaj
 Enqelab Square, Tehran
 Enqelab Square, Isfahan
 Enqelab Street, Tehran